The 2008 Hong Kong Super Series is the twelfth tournament of the 2008 BWF Super Series in badminton. It was held in Wan Chai, Hong Kong from 24 to 30 November 2008.

Men's singles

Results

Women's singles

Results

Men's doubles

Results

Women's doubles

Results

Mixed doubles

Results

External links
Hong Kong Open Super Series 08 at tournamentsoftware.com

Hong Kong Super Series, 2008
Hong Kong Open (badminton)
Hong Kong
Wan Chai